Philipp Handler (born 8 October 1991, in New York City) is a Swiss Paralympic sprinter who competes in international level events. He is a five time European medalist and has participated at the Paralympic Games in 2012 and 2016 but did not medal. He moved from New York City to Embrach, Switzerland when he was five years old.

References

1991 births
Living people
Track and field athletes from New York City
Paralympic athletes of Switzerland
Swiss male sprinters
Athletes (track and field) at the 2012 Summer Paralympics
Athletes (track and field) at the 2016 Summer Paralympics
Medalists at the World Para Athletics European Championships
American emigrants to Switzerland
Visually impaired sprinters
Paralympic sprinters
Swiss blind people